The Morris House is a historic house in rural White County, Arkansas.  It is located northwest of Bradford, near the junction of Morris Drive and Jerry Smith Road.  It is two story wood-frame structure, with a gabled roof and weatherboard siding.  It is a double-pile central-hall plan, with five bays across, and a two-story porch with square posts.  The house was built in 1860 for Henry Morris, one of the first settlers of the area.

The house was listed on the National Register of Historic Places in 1978.

See also
National Register of Historic Places listings in White County, Arkansas

References

Houses on the National Register of Historic Places in Arkansas
Houses completed in 1860
Houses in White County, Arkansas
National Register of Historic Places in White County, Arkansas
Central-passage houses
1860 establishments in Arkansas